The 2011 MTV Movie Awards were held on June 5, 2011 at the Gibson Amphitheatre in Universal City, California and were hosted by Jason Sudeikis.

On May 3, the nominees were announced. The Twilight Saga: Eclipse lead the nominations with eight followed by Inception with seven, Harry Potter and the Deathly Hallows – Part 1 with six, The Social Network with five, and Black Swan with four.
In addition, Emma Stone won the award for Best Comedic Performance, becoming the second female winner of the award and first one since 2001. The Show included 12 categories, including Best Line From a Movie. Also, WTF Moment was re-titled Best Jaw Dropping Moment, and the Global Superstar category was retired after debuting in the 2010 show.

Performers
Lupe Fiasco featuring Trey Songz — "Out of My Head"/"The Show Goes On"
Foo Fighters — "Walk"

Presenters
Justin Timberlake and Mila Kunis — presented Best Male Performance
J. J. Abrams, Joel Courtney, Elle Fanning, and Steven Spielberg — presented exclusive clip from Super 8
Steve Carell, Ryan Gosling, and Emma Stone — presented Best Villain
Jim Carrey — introduced Foo Fighters
Chris Evans — presented reminder to vote for Best Movie
Aziz Ansari, Danny McBride, and Nick Swardson — presented Best Jaw-Dropping Moment
Shia LaBeouf, Josh Duhamel, Rosie Huntington-Whiteley, and Patrick Dempsey — presented Best Fight
Blake Lively and Ryan Reynolds — presented Best Kiss
Emma Watson — presented clip from Harry Potter and the Deathly Hallows: Part 2
Patrick Dempsey, Robert Pattinson, and Chelsea Handler — presented MTV Generation Award
Cameron Diaz and Jason Segel — presented Best Line From a Movie
Ashton Kutcher and Nicki Minaj — presented Best Female Performance
Selena Gomez, Katie Cassidy, and Leighton Meester — introduced Trey Songz and Lupe Fiasco
Jason Bateman, Charlie Day, and Jason Sudeikis — presented Best Comedic Performance
Kristen Stewart, Robert Pattinson, and Taylor Lautner — presented exclusive clip from The Twilight Saga: Breaking Dawn - Part 1
Gary Busey — presented Best Movie

Awards

MTV Generation Award 
Reese Witherspoon

Notes

References

External links 

MTV Movie & TV Awards
MTV Movie Awards
MTV Movie
2011 in Los Angeles
2011 in American cinema